The Dassault Mirage 4000 (sometimes called the Super Mirage 4000) was a French prototype twinjet fighter aircraft developed by Dassault-Breguet from their Mirage 2000.

Design and development

The Mirage 4000 was noticeably larger and heavier than the single-engined Mirage 2000, the 4000 having two SNECMA M53-2 turbofans. It also featured small canards above the engine air intakes and a true bubble canopy, compared to the Mirage 2000 and previous Mirages. Despite the changes, the two aircraft remained similar, sharing the delta wing design, semi-conical Oswatitsch-type air intakes, and general configuration.

The Mirage 4000 first flew on 9 March 1979. It was financed as a private venture by Dassault. The Mirage 4000 was comparable in size to the United States F-15 Eagle, and was designed to be both a long-range interceptor and a capable fighter-bomber.

In the early 1980s, Dassault ended the program shortly after the Saudis chose the Tornado (see Al-Yamamah arms deal) as their preferred aircraft. Iran had been lost as a potential customer after the coup against the Shah in 1979. The French Air Force preferred to concentrate on the Mirage 2000, leaving Dassault with no customers. Some of the expertise thus gained would later influence the Dassault Rafale.

The only prototype moved to its final residence at the Musée de l'air et de l'espace (Paris Air and Space Museum) in 1992.

Specifications (Mirage 4000)

See also

References

Bibliography

 

Canard aircraft
Twinjets
Delta-wing aircraft
Mirage 4000
1970s French fighter aircraft
Cancelled military aircraft projects of France
Aircraft first flown in 1979